Arne Jensen may refer to:

 Arne Jensen (archer) (born 1998), Tongan archer
 Arne Jensen (banker) (1914–2002), Norwegian banker
 Arne A. Jensen (1954–2020), Norwegian businessman and corporate executive
 Arne Henry Jensen (1927–2012), Norwegian politician
 Arne Preben Jensen (born 1932), Danish Olympic equestrian